The American pop rock band Imagine Dragons has released six studio albums, four live albums, one compilation album, ten extended plays, twenty-seven singles, six promotional singles and twenty-three music videos. According to Recording Industry Association of America, they have sold 74.5 million digital singles and 12 million albums in the US. Imagine Dragons has sold 46 million albums and 55 million singles worldwide, including 74 billion global career streams, making them among the best-selling rock bands in history. Billboard named them as the 29th Greatest Adult Alternative artist of all time, as well as the 13th Top Artist of 2010s in the United States.

Imagine Dragons released an extended play, Speak to Me in 2008, followed by a self-titled EP, Hell and Silence and It's Time in September 2009, June 2010, and March 2011 respectively. The band later found commercial success with the release of their fifth extended play, Continued Silence, in February 2012. "It's Time" was released as the lead single from the EP, peaking at number fifteen on the United States Billboard Hot 100. It has since sold over 6 million copies in the United States. Continued Silence went on to peak at number 40 on the Billboard 200 in the United States. As of August 31, 2021, Imagine Dragons are also one of the highest certified digital singles acts in the United States by the Recording Industry Association of America (RIAA), having been certified for 74.5 million digital singles in the country alone.

Night Visions, the band's debut studio album, was released in September 2012; it peaked at number two on the Billboard 200 and topped the Billboard Top Alternative Albums and Billboard Top Rock Albums charts. In addition to "It's Time", the album also contains the singles "Radioactive" and "Demons". The former single peaked at number three on the Billboard Hot 100 and has since sold over 8.6 million copies in the United States. It also became a top–ten hit in numerous countries, such as Australia, Germany and Sweden. "Demons" has also been certified Diamond by the RIAA and peaked at number six on the Billboard Hot 100.

The band's second studio album, Smoke + Mirrors, was released in February 2015, debuting at the top of the Billboard 200. The album was preceded by 3 singles: "I Bet My Life", which peaked in the top 40 of the Billboard Hot 100 at number 28, "Gold", and "Shots". "I Bet My Life" and "Shots" both peaked within the top 10 on Billboards Hot Rock and Alternative chart.

The band followed this with their third studio album, Evolve, in June 2017. The record was preceded by two singles, "Believer" and Thunder", which both went on to peak at number four on the Billboard Hot 100. "Believer" was later certified diamond by the RIAA. They were then followed by a third single, "Whatever It Takes", which reached number 12.  All three songs have peaked at number one on the Hot Rock Songs chart. After the Evolve tour was completed, they released their fourth studio album Origins on November 9, 2018. Five singles were released from the album: "Natural", "Zero", "Machine", "Bad Liar", and "Birds" featuring Elisa.

After taking a break of more than two years, the band announced their fifth studio album, Mercury – Act 1, which was released on September 3, 2021. The album was preceded by three singles: "Follow You", "Cutthroat", and "Wrecked". "Follow You" peaked at number 7 on the Hot Rock and Alternative chart and number one on Rock and Alternative Airplay, and also received an alternate version titled "Follow You (Summer '21)".

Albums

Studio albums

Reissue albums

Live albums

Extended plays

Singles

As lead artist

Promotional singles

Other charted and certified songs

Guest appearances

Music videos

Notes

References

External links
 Official website
 Imagine Dragons at AllMusic
 
 

Discography
Discographies of American artists
Rock music group discographies
Pop music group discographies